Leonardo Delfino (born October 1, 1976, in Castelar (Buenos Aires), Argentina) is an Argentine footballer currently playing for Sport Huancayo of the Primera División in Peru.

Teams
  Boca Juniors 1993–1996
  Grupo Universitario 1996–1997
  Deportivo Morón 1998
  Banfield 1999-2000
  San Miguel 2000–2001
  Unión La Calera 2001-2002
  Tigre 2003
  Sarmiento de Junín 2003

External links
 
 Profile at En una Baldosa 
 

1976 births
Living people
Argentine footballers
Argentine expatriate footballers
Boca Juniors footballers
Club Atlético Banfield footballers
Club Atlético Tigre footballers
Deportivo Morón footballers
Unión La Calera footballers
Primera B de Chile players
Expatriate footballers in Chile
Association football forwards
People from Morón Partido
Sportspeople from Buenos Aires Province